Walter Beach Humphrey (1892–1966) was an American artist and illustrator.

Humphrey was born in Elkhorn, Wisconsin. He attended Dartmouth College, graduating in 1914, and also studied at the Art Students League.

His work was featured on covers of magazines such as The Saturday Evening Post. He also did book illustrations and portraits. He painted murals on the walls of the rathskeller of Dartmouth's Thayer Hall illustrating a song about college founder Eleazer Wheelock.

Humphrey did covers for leading magazines including The Saturday Evening Post, book illustrations, portraits and other art work. He was a resident of New Rochelle, New York, a well known artist colony and home to many of the top commercial illustrators of the day., where he also served on The New Rochelle Art Association and the New Rochelle Council on The Arts. He taught commercial art at New Rochelle High School for 22 years as well. He also taught at the University of Chicago, Bradley University in Peoria, Illinois, and the School of Commerce of New York University.

He died at the hospital in Glens Falls, New York, in October 1966, at the age of 73.

References

External links
 Walter Beach Humphrey

1892 births
1966 deaths
People from Elkhorn, Wisconsin
Artists from New Rochelle, New York
American magazine illustrators
Dartmouth College alumni
20th-century American painters
American male painters
20th-century American male artists